Krogness is a surname. Notable people with the surname include:

Johan Richard Krogness (1814–1872), Norwegian businessperson and politician
Marianne Krogness (born 1951), Norwegian actress, singer and revue artist
Ole Andreas Krogness (1886–1934), Norwegian physicist
Ole Andreas Krogness (politician) (1802–1869), Norwegian businessperson, merchant and politician